The Argentina Trade and Cultural Office (Spanish: Oficina Comercial y Cultural de Argentina) represents the interests of Argentina in Taiwan in the absence of formal diplomatic relations. It has functioned as a de facto embassy since its establishment in July 1992. 

Its counterpart in Argentina is the Taipei Economic and Cultural Office in Argentina in Buenos Aires. 
 
The Office is headed by the Director, Carlos Alberto Argañaraz.

See also
 List of diplomatic missions in Taiwan
 List of diplomatic missions of Argentina

References

Taipei
Representative Offices in Taipei
Argentina–Taiwan relations